Sabine Stiefbold is a German Paralympic skier , who represented West Germany in alpine skiing at the 1980 Paralympic Winter Games, and 1984 Paralympic Winter Games. She won a total of five medals, including one gold medal, two silver medals. and two bronze medals.

Career 
At the 1980 Paralympic Winter Games, Stiefbold ranked 3rd in the 3B giant slalom with a time of 3: 15.88 (1st place Brigitte Madlener who finished the race in 2: 52.86 and 2nd place Sabine Barisch in 3: 13.47  ), and 4th place in the special slalom in 3: 13.47  ).

At the 1984 Paralympic Winter Games, in Innsbruck, she won a total of four medals: gold in the slalom LW5 / 7 (with a realized time of 1: 33.78  ), two silvers (in the giant slalom races in 1:48.22,  and alpine super combined in 2: 48.72), and a bronze in downhill (bronze with a time of 1: 36.27, gold for the Austrian athlete Brigitte Madlener in 1: 24.92 and silver for compatriot Sabine Barisch in 1:27.65 ); all in the LW5 / 7 category.

References 

Living people
Paralympic alpine skiers of Germany
German female alpine skiers
Alpine skiers at the 1980 Winter Paralympics
Alpine skiers at the 1984 Winter Paralympics
Medalists at the 1980 Winter Paralympics
Medalists at the 1984 Winter Paralympics
Paralympic gold medalists for Germany
Paralympic silver medalists for Germany
Paralympic bronze medalists for Germany
Date of birth missing (living people)